Sportpark Thurlede is a cricket ground in Schiedam, Netherlands.  The first recorded match on the ground came in 1996 when the Netherlands played Somerset in a friendly.  The ground later held a single Women's One Day International there in 2003 between Scotland Women played West Indies Women in the IWCC Trophy. 

The Netherlands hosted the 2010 World Cricket League Division One tournament, with two One Day Internationals being played there, both matches being between Canada and Kenya.  These matches also hold List A status, with the ground hosting two more List A matches later in 2010 when the ground hosted two matches in the 2010 Clydesdale Bank 40.  In these the Netherlands played Derbyshire and Yorkshire.

The ground is used by Excelsior 20 Cricket Club.

References

External links
Sportpark Thurlede at ESPNcricinfo
Sportpark Thurlede at CricketArchive

Cricket grounds in the Netherlands
Sports venues in South Holland
Buildings and structures in Schiedam
Sport in Schiedam